Major-General Sutton Martin O’Heguerty Abraham CB MC (26 January 1919 – 15 May 2001) was a British military officer who served as Director of Combat Development at the Ministry of Defence.

Career 
Abraham was born to Captain Edgar Abraham, of the Indian Civil Service, and Ruth Eostre Abraham.  Educated at Eton and Trinity College, Cambridge, he was commissioned into the 12th Royal Lancers in 1939.  He won two MCs within a year during operations in the Western dessert in 1942. He personally destroyed a German anti-tank gun and then took the surrender of 63 German soldiers. He went on to be Director of Combat Development at the Ministry of Defence in 1968 and chief of the Joint Services Liaison Organisation in the British Army of the Rhine in 1971 before retiring in 1973.

He served as Colonel of the 9th/12th Royal Lancers, 1977-1981.

References

Notes 

 Abraham's entry in Who's Who

1919 births
2001 deaths
British people of Portuguese-Jewish descent
People educated at Eton College
Alumni of Trinity College, Cambridge
British Army major generals
12th Royal Lancers officers
Companions of the Order of the Bath
Recipients of the Military Cross
British people in colonial India
British Army personnel of World War II